The white-winged flying fox (Desmalopex leucopterus), also known as the mottle-winged flying fox is a species of bat in the family Pteropodidae. They are endemic to the Philippines. Their natural habitats are subtropical and tropical dry forests.  In 2008, Giannini et al. revived the genus Desmalopex and placed D. leucopterus in it.

References

Mammals of the Philippines
Desmalopex
Mammals described in 1853
Bats of Southeast Asia
Taxa named by Coenraad Jacob Temminck
Endemic fauna of the Philippines
Fauna of Luzon
Fauna of Catanduanes
Fauna of Dinagat Islands
Taxonomy articles created by Polbot